Peter Stocker (born 5 October 1956) is a Swiss rower. He competed in the men's coxed four event at the 1980 Summer Olympics.

References

External links
 

1956 births
Living people
Swiss male rowers
Olympic rowers of Switzerland
Rowers at the 1980 Summer Olympics
Place of birth missing (living people)